Michel Sorridimi (born 5 November 1956) is an Australian former rugby league footballer who played in the 1970s and 1980s.

Career

A St George Dragons junior from the Kingsgrove Colts, Michel 'Zorro' Sorridimi was graded in 1974. Sorridimi played eight first grade seasons with St George and won a premiership with the club in 1979 playing on the wing in the victory over the Canterbury-Bankstown Bulldogs. A crowd favourite at Kogarah's Jubilee Oval, Sorridimi's career was curtailed by injury in the early 1980s, and he retired in 1982.

References

1956 births
St. George Dragons players
Australian rugby league players
Living people
Rugby league wingers
Rugby league players from Sydney